Farchant is a municipality in the district of Garmisch-Partenkirchen, in Bavaria, Germany.

Transport
The district has a railway station, on the Munich–Garmisch-Partenkirchen railway.

References

Garmisch-Partenkirchen (district)